Yantis High School is a public high school located in Yantis, Texas (USA). It is part of the Yantis Independent School District located in northwest Wood County and classified as a 1A school by the UIL. In 2015, the school was rated "Met Standard" by the Texas Education Agency.

Athletics
The Yantis Owls compete in these sports - 

Basketball
Cross Country
Golf
Softball
Tennis
Track and Field
Volleyball

State Titles
One Act Play - 
2002(1A)

References

External links
Yantis ISD

Schools in Wood County, Texas
Public high schools in Texas